Holderness is a region of the East Riding of Yorkshire, England.

Holderness may also refer to:

Holderness (surname)
Holderness (borough), a former borough of Humberside, England
Holderness (UK Parliament constituency), a former constituency in England
Holderness Wapentake, a former wapentake in the East Riding of Yorkshire, England
Holderness, New Hampshire, a town in the United States
Holderness School, a college preparatory school in Holderness, New Hampshire
HMS Holderness, two ships of the Royal Navy